In the mid-6th century, the introduction of Buddhism from Korea (Baekje) to Japan resulted in a revival of Japanese sculpture. Buddhist monks, artisans and scholars settled around the capital in Yamato Province (present day Nara Prefecture) and passed their techniques to native craftsmen. Consequently, early Japanese sculptures from the Asuka and Hakuhō periods show strong influences of continental art, which initially were characterized by almond-shaped eyes, upward-turned crescent-shaped lips and symmetrically arranged folds in the clothing. The workshop of the Japanese sculptor Tori Busshi, who was strongly influenced by the Northern Wei style, produced works which exemplify such characteristics. The Shakyamuni triad and the Guze Kannon at Hōryū-ji are prime examples. By the late 7th century, wood replaced bronze and copper. By the early Tang dynasty, greater realism was expressed by fuller forms, long narrow slit eyes, softer facial features, flowing garments and embellishments with ornaments such as bracelets and jewels. Two prominent examples of sculptures of this period are the Shō Kannon at Yakushi-ji and the Yumechigai Kannon at Hōryū-ji.

During the Nara period, from 710 to 794, the government established and supported workshops called zōbussho, the most prominent of which was located in the capital Nara at Tōdai-ji, which produced Buddhist statuary. Clay, lacquer and wood, in addition to bronze, were used. Stylistically, the sculptures were influenced by the high Tang style, showing fuller body modelling, more natural drapery and a greater sense of movement. Representative examples of Nara period sculpture include the Great Buddha and the Four Heavenly Kings at Tōdai-ji, or the Eight Legions at Kōfuku-ji.

Early Heian period works before the mid-10th century appear heavy compared to Nara period statues, carved from single blocks of wood, and characterised by draperies carved with alternating round and sharply cut folds. Stylistically, they followed high to later Tang style. In the Heian period the zōbussho were replaced with temple-run and independent workshops; wood became the primary medium; and a specific Japanese style emerged. By the mid-10th century, the style was refined presenting a more calm and gentle appearance, with attenuated proportions. Jōchō was the most important sculptor of this time, and he used the yosegi technique, in which several pieces of wood are joined to sculpt a single figure. The Amida Nyorai at Byōdō-in is the only extant work by Jōchō.
Japanese sculpture experienced a renaissance during the Kamakura period, led by the Kei school. Partially influenced by Song dynasty China, their sculpture is characterised by realism featuring elaborate top knots, jewelry, and wavy drapery. Although predominantly wooden, bronze was also used as a material for the statues. As a novelty, portrait sculptures of prominent monks were created adjacent to the depiction of Buddhist deities.

The term "National Treasure" has been used in Japan to denote cultural properties since 1897.
The definition and the criteria have changed since the inception of the term. These sculptures adhere to the current definition, and have been designated national treasures since the Law for the Protection of Cultural Properties came into force on June 9, 1951. The items are selected by the Ministry of Education, Culture, Sports, Science and Technology based on their "especially high historical or artistic value". This list presents 140 entries of sculptures, including those from Classical and early Feudal Japan of the 7th-century Asuka period to the 13th-century Kamakura period, although the number of sculptures is higher, because groups of related sculptures have sometimes been joined to form single entries. The sculptures listed depict Buddhist and Shintō deities or priests venerated as founders of temples. Some of the most ancient sculptures were imported directly from China.

Statistics
Various materials have been used for the sculptures. Although most are wooden, 12 entries in the list are bronze, 11 are lacquer, 7 are made of clay and 1 entry, the Usuki Stone Buddhas, is a stone sculpture. Typically hinoki, Japanese nutmeg, sandalwood and camphorwood were the woods used for the wooden sculptures. Wooden sculptures were often lacquered or covered with gold-leaf. The objects on the list are located in Buddhist temples, or in museums associated with temples. Some items are located in shrines, as well as in secular museums.

Nara Prefecture is home to the largest number of National Treasure sculptures, with 77 of the 140 entries. Together with the 41 entries located in Kyoto Prefecture, they constitute the bulk of sculptural National Treasures. Hōryū-ji and Kōfuku-ji are the locations with the most entries, with 18 and 18 designations respectively.

Usage
The table's columns (except for Remarks and Pictures) are sortable pressing the arrows symbols. The following gives an overview of what is included in the table and how the sorting works.
Name: name as registered in the List of National Treasures
Remarks: placement of statues (as a group, separately,...) and artist (if known)
Date: period and year; The column entries sort by year. If only a period is known, they sort by the start year of that period.
Material and technique: wood/bronze/..., lacquered/colored/...; The column entries sort by the main material (stone/clay/wood/lacquer/bronze).
Pose: standing/seated Amida Nyorai/Yakushi Nyorai/...; The column entries sort by the name of the principal image or as "set" in the case of sets of sculptures that don't fall under a common group name.
Height: height in cm; The column entries sort by the largest height if an entry is a group of statues.
Present location: "building-name temple/museum/shrine-name town-name prefecture-name"; The column entries sort as "prefecture-name town-name temple/museum/shrine-name building-name".
Image: picture of the statue or a characteristic statue in a group of statues

Treasures

See also
Independent Administrative Institution National Museum
Japanese sculpture
Nara Research Institute for Cultural Properties
Shinjo Ito
Tokyo Research Institute for Cultural Properties

Notes

References

Bibliography

.

External links
 

Buddhist sculpture
National Treasures
Sculptures
Lists of statues
Lists of tourist attractions in Japan
Shinto